The Colombia women's rugby team (also known by their nickname Las Tucanes) represents Colombia in women's Rugby union internationally.

History
Colombia's Development XV's team played two matches against Venezuela in San Cristóbal, Venezuela on the 21st and 23rd of November, 2014. They won both games 30–0 and 25–5.

On 25 August, 2019 Colombia beat Brazil 28–7 in Medellín, Colombia.

Colombia kept their Rugby World Cup 2021 dreams alive after they beat Brazil 23–19 in their Sudamérica face-off. They advanced into the next stage of qualification for the World Cup in a South America/Africa play-off against Kenya. They defeated Kenya 16–15 and earned a spot at a repechage tournament that will decide the final team to qualify for the 2021 Rugby World Cup. Colombia defeated Kazakhstan 18–10 in their semifinal match. They lost to Scotland in their Final Qualification Tournament and missed out on qualifying for the World Cup.

Players 
Squad for November test against Brazil:

Records 

(Full internationals only)

Full internationals

Other matches

See also 
 Rugby union in Colombia

References

South American national rugby union teams
National team
Rugby union